Introduction to Life is a 1963 Soviet drama film about World War II seen through the eyes of a young boy from Leningrad. It won a Special Jury Prize at the 24th Venice International Film Festival.

Plot
The Great Patriotic War is nearing the end. In a train two youths, Volodya (Boris Tokarev) and Valya (Natalia Bogunova) returning from evacuation to Leningrad cross paths for a few minutes. The plot carries them to their first random encounter that takes place in the summer of 1941 at a crowded refugee station. The period of growing adolescents, their introduction to adult life occurs in the arduous years of war. During the bombing of the evacuation train near the Mga station, dies the mother (Lyubov Sokolova) of Valya and her younger sister Lucy (Lida Volkova). After long wanderings in orphanages, the girls are found by their own aunt and they find shelter in her house.

The fate of Volodya Jakubowski develops in a difficult way; mother (Nina Urgant) is divorced from his own father (Yuri Volkov), who has long had another wife and son Oleg (Nikolai Burlyayev), a half-brother of Volodya. In evacuation the mother is trying to arrange her personal life, and gets close to the army captain (Stanislav Checkan). Not wanting to burden her, the teenager takes a job at a defensive aircraft factory and moves to a hostel. There he finds a good friend - Romka (Valery Nosik). Learning that the woman is pregnant, the captain breaks up with Volodya's mother. The unfavorable reputation of a "loose" woman, a baby girl born without a father, make her unable to rent decent accommodation. The teen takes has a difficult time coping with his mother's unhappy personal life, and goes to Leningrad to his father, so that he would issue a due summons to the city from which the blockade was only recently lifted. Jakubowski Sr. initially refuses to help (facts about the mothers infidelity are discovered) but matured Volodya is insistent and gets what he wants. The father objects to communication between Volodya and Oleg however the teenagers are introduced and become friends.

Cast
Boris Tokarev as Volodya Yakubovsky
Nina Urgant as mother of Volodya
Yuri Volkov as Volodya's father
Nikolai Burlyayev as Oleg
Natalia Bohunova as Valya
Lida Volkova as Lyusa
Lyubov Sokolova as mother of Valya and Lyusa
Lyubov Malinovskaya as Dusya  
Valeriy Nosik as Romka  
Viktor Avdyushko as Bobrov

External links

1963 drama films
1963 films
Soviet drama films
Russian drama films
Films directed by Igor Talankin
Soviet World War II films
Venice Grand Jury Prize winners
1960s Russian-language films